Gustavo Bebianno Rocha (18 January 1964 – 14 March 2020) was a Brazilian lawyer and advisor to President Jair Bolsonaro (PSL). Bebianno became Acting Chairman of the Social Liberal Party in March 2018 after Luciano Bivar registered to run for federal deputy in the 2018 elections.

Biography
Bebianno began his graduation in Law in the Pontifical Catholic University of Rio de Janeiro (PUC-Rio), but dropped out in 1990. In the same year, he moved to Miami to give Brazilian jiu-jitsu classes after reaching black belt. Four years later, he returned to Rio to finish his studies. In 2014, Gustavo offered his services as lawyer to then federal deputy Jair Bolsonaro, but the congressman kindly refused, accepting only three years later, in 2017, to support him in his presidential campaign.

After joining the Social Liberal Party in March 2018, Bebianno was elected National Deputy Chairman of the party, becoming Acting National Chairman after the temporary leave of Luciano Bivar, president and founder of the PSL.

On 28 October 2018 he stepped down as party Chairman and Bivar retook his office.

On 21 November 2018, almost a month after Bolsonaro's win in the 2018 election, Bebianno was announced Secretary-General of the Presidency.

On 15 February 2019, President Bolsonaro decided to fire Bebianno after a scheme in which a federal deputy candidate received 400,000 BRL ( USD) from a public fund and got only 274 votes in the 2018 election, when Bebianno was the PSL National President. Bebianno claimed to have formal documentation for all the funds he requested at direction by the State.

On 14 March 2020, Bebianno died suddenly in Teresópolis, Rio de Janeiro due to a heart attack.

References

1964 births
2020 deaths
Social Liberal Party (Brazil) politicians
Brazilian Social Democracy Party politicians
20th-century Brazilian lawyers
People from Rio de Janeiro (city)
Pontifical Catholic University of Rio de Janeiro alumni
21st-century Brazilian lawyers